Cornelius Gurlitt may refer to:

 Cornelius Gurlitt (composer) (1820–1901), German composer
 Cornelius Gurlitt (art historian) (1850–1938), German art historian and architect (nephew of the elder Cornelius Gurlitt)
 Cornelius Gurlitt (art collector) (1932–2014), grandson of the art historian, inheritor of the Gurlitt Collection of artworks assembled by his father Hildebrand Gurlitt